Haripad  is a Municipality in Onattukara region of Alappuzha District, Kerala, India located between Alappuzha and Kollam on the National Highway 66. Haripad is bordered on the east by Pallippad, Veeyapuram and Karuvatta to the north, Kumarapuram and Karthikappally to the West, and on the south by Cheppad. It is known as the land of art, artists, land of snake boats, land of music, dance and drama. It is also popularly known as Kshetranagari (Town of Temples) in which Haripad Temple being the chief one among them.
]
A main feature of Haripad which attracts even the foreigners is the "Payippad Jalolsavam". It is believed that the currently worshiping idol of Lord Subrahmanya was brought from Kandalloor with escort of snake boats and Valla Sadya. The Rajiv Gandhi Combined Cycle Power Plant (NTPC, Kayamkulam) is located in Haripad Assembly Constituency.

Haripad derived its name from either Aripad (Ari meaning Rice), or "Harigeethapuram". The population of Haripad is 16,445, as of the 2011 census.

History
Earlier it was known as Arippatt, the name Haripad came into prominence only in the 20th century. Some scholars say that it means place near water (ari- arike pat place). During the period of European colonization, In the opinion of the Dutch Governor Gollanez the sea coast between Quilon and Purakkad which the Dutch called 'Martha" and which region was known as Karthikappally consisted of two regions or nation states, Karnoppally (present-day Karunagapally) and Karimpali. More specifically, Haripad was located in Karimpali which was the area between Kayamkulam and Purakkad and was also known as Vettimana.

The capital of Vettimana was Karimpalil palace (near the present-day Haripad Railway Station), but at some point it was moved to Karthikappally. In 1742 Marthanda Varma defeated Karthikappally region and added it to Travancore State. During the period of the kingship, Haripad was a town, the remaining town hall stands as proof. Also during this period, Haripad was the administrative center of Karthikappally Taluk, and it was from Haripad that the major portion of rice for the state was produced. It is believed that famous poet Kerala Varma Valiakoi Thampuran was kept under house arrest in Haripad Ananthapuram Palace and during his stay at Haripad he wrote 'Mayoora Sandesham' in which he expressed his grief of being separated from his dear wife.

In 1921 Haripad got municipal town status, however in 1941 it was downgraded to a non-municipal town. Finally, in 1954 it was changed into a Panchayat. In 2015, it was again upgraded to municipality. Prof. Sudha Suseelan is the 1st chairperson in Haripad Municipality.

Geography

Haripad is a town and municipality in Alappuzha District of Kerala State in India. Its coordinates are Latitude: 9°18′0″N and Longitude: 76°28′0″E, and lies at an elevation of 13 meters. It is bordered on the east by Pallippad, Karuvatta to the north, Kumarapuram and Mahadevikadu to the West, and on the south by Nangiarkulangara. Haripad is close to the Arabian Sea and connects Mavelikkara and Thrikkunnappuzha. Haripad Railway station is located in the heart of the town. Kayamkulam Junction is one of the major Railway stations which is at a distance of 14 kilometers. The nearest airport is at Kochi which is at a 3 h 5 min away (114.1 km) via NH66.

Being located in southwestern India, the summer months are characterized by moderately high temperature and high humidity. Monsoon brings rains between late April and July with the best weather being from November to March. As Haripad locates close to the coast heavy annual rainfall is received.

Arts and culture

The two most famous temples in Haripad are Subrahmanya Swamy temple and Mannarasala Temple.

The Subrahmanya Swamy temple in Haripad is one of the oldest temples in Kerala. Dedicated to Subrahmanya Swamy, it is believed that the temple was established even before the advent of Kali Yuga. The temple was consecrated on the Pushya star of Makara Masa. This day is celebrated as the founding day of the temple every year. It is believed that Lord Vishnu appreaded as a saint to consecrate the temple. In 1096 of the Malayalam calendar, the temple caught fire, but the golden flag mast (erected 1067) and the Koothambalam were saved from the fire. The current temple was built during the period of King Chithira Thirunal Balarama Varma, who reigned from 1930 to 1949 (Gregorian Calendar). This temple holds three festivals yearly. The Chithira Ulsavam which starts on the day of Vishu and lasts ten days.

The Mannarasala Temple is a Nagaraja temple situated near Haripad. Like most snake temples, it is nestled in a forest glade, and has over 30,000 images of snakes along the paths and among the trees.  It is the largest such temple in Kerala. Women seeking fertility come to worship there, and upon the birth of their child, they come again to hold thanksgiving ceremonies, often bringing new snake images as offerings. Sri Ramakrishna Asram at Haripad is the first one in the State of Kerala established in 1913.

Another main feature of Haripad which attracts even the foreigners is the Payippad Jalolsavam, a three-day water festival conducted on the nearby Payippad Lake. It is believed the current idol of Lord Subrahmanya was brought from Kandalloor with escort of snake boats and vallasadya. Payippad Jalolsavam is conducted to renew this memory.

Government

Haripad is the headquarters of Karthikappally taluk, which includes 18 small villages: Arattupuzha, Cheppad, Cheruthana, Chingoli, Haripad, Kandallor, Mahadevikad, Karthikappally, Karuvatta, Keerikkad, Krishnapuram, Kumarapuram, Muthukulam, Pallippad, Pathiyoor, Puthuppally, Thrikkunnapuzha and Veeyapuram.

These all places come together to form the Haripad Legislative Assembly Constituency. The current MLA of Haripad Assembly Constituency is Shri Ramesh Chennithala of Indian National Congress .

The Haripad Assembly Constituency is part of Alappuzha (Lok Sabha constituency). A.M.Ariff of Communist Party of India(Marxist) is the current MP of Alappuzha.

Notable people 
ARTICLE

 Swami Nirmalananda (1863–1938), a direct monastic disciple of Sri Ramakrishna (1836–1886)
 Kerala Varma Valiya Koithampuran (1845–1914) author of Mayurasandesa, stayed in Haripad while writing the Sandesh Kavyam which consists of  love letters to his dear wife to be sent through peacocks. 
 T. K. Madhavan (1885–1930), social reformer
 V. Dakshinamoorthy (1919–2013), carnatic musician
 Padmarajan (1945–1991), Malayalam film director and writer
 Ramesh Chennithala, present MLA of Haripad, Former Home Minister
 M. G. Radhakrishnan (1940–2010), carnatic musician
 K. Omanakutty (1943–), musician
 M. G. Sreekumar (1957–), musician, singer, music director
 Rajesh Pillai (1974–2016), film director
 A. P. Udhayabhanu (1915–1999), Congress leader, writer
 Sreekumaran Thampi (1940–), writer, lyricist
 K. Madhu (1953–), director
 Erickavu N. Sunil (1977-), National award-winning Mridangam artist, author
 Mallika Sukumaran (1954–), actress
 Madhu Muttom (1951–), script writer
 Ashokan (1960–), actor
 Navya Nair (1985-)cine Artist
 CBC Warrier (1932–2013), Ex-MLA, CPM Leader
 Santhosh Sivan (1964–), cinematographer 

Lopamudra R, Poet, Translator, Kendra Sahitya Akademi Yuva Puraskar and OV Vijayan Sahitya Award, Thunjan Smaraka Award Winner
 Vishnu S. Warrier (1987-), Author and FIDE rated Chess Player,
 Dr.Arun Kumar S, author poet,works , Sudarsanam, Atmayanathinte Kavitha, Good Vision.

References

External links 

About Karichalchundan
snakeboat races – Snake boat races in Haripad
Sociocultural History – History of Haripad
Haripad – Haripad

Cities and towns in Alappuzha district